The London Borough of Croydon is a London borough in south London, part of Outer London. It is the southernmost borough of London. At its centre is the historic town of Croydon from which the borough takes its name; while other urban centres include Coulsdon, Purley, South Norwood, Norbury, New Addington and Thornton Heath. Croydon is mentioned in Domesday Book, and from a small market town has expanded into one of the most populous areas on the fringe of London. The borough is now one of London's leading business, financial and cultural centres, and its influence in entertainment and the arts contribute to its status as a major metropolitan centre. Its population is 390,719, making it the largest London borough and sixteenth largest English district.

The borough was formed in 1965 from the merger of the County Borough of Croydon with Coulsdon and Purley Urban District, both of which had been within Surrey. The local authority, Croydon London Borough Council, is now part of London Councils, the local government association for Greater London. The economic strength of Croydon dates back mainly to Croydon Airport which was a major factor in the development of Croydon as a business centre. Once London's main airport for all international flights to and from the capital, it was closed on 30 September 1959 due to the lack of expansion space needed for an airport to serve the growing city. It is now a Grade II listed building and tourist attraction. Croydon Council and its predecessor Croydon Corporation unsuccessfully applied for city status in 1954, 2000, 2002 and 2012. The area is currently going through a large regeneration project called Croydon Vision 2020 which is predicted to attract more businesses and tourists to the area as well as backing Croydon's bid to become "London's Third City" (after the City of London and Westminster). Croydon is mostly urban, though there are large suburban and rural uplands towards the south of the borough. Since 2003, Croydon has been certified as a Fairtrade borough by the Fairtrade Foundation. It was the first London borough to have Fairtrade status which is awarded on certain criteria.

The area is one of the hearts of culture in London and the South East of England. Institutions such as the major arts and entertainment centre Fairfield Halls add to the vibrancy of the borough. However, its famous fringe theatre, the Warehouse Theatre, went into administration in 2012 when the council withdrew funding, and the building itself was demolished in 2013. The Croydon Clocktower was opened by Queen Elizabeth II in 1994 as an arts venue featuring a library, the independent David Lean Cinema (closed by the council in 2011 after sixteen years of operating, but now partially reopened on a part-time and volunteer basis) and museum. From 2000 to 2010, Croydon staged an annual summer festival celebrating the area's black and Indian cultural diversity, with audiences reaching over 50,000 people. 

Premier League football club Crystal Palace F.C. play at Selhurst Park in Selhurst, a stadium they have been based in since 1924. Other landmarks in the borough include Addington Palace, an eighteenth-century mansion which became the official second residence of six Archbishops of Canterbury, Shirley Windmill, one of the few surviving large windmills in Greater London built in the 1850s, and the BRIT School, a creative arts institute run by the BRIT Trust which has produced artists such as Adele, Amy Winehouse and Leona Lewis.

History
  For the history of the original town see History of Croydon

The London Borough of Croydon was formed in 1965 from the Coulsdon and Purley Urban District and the County Borough of Croydon. The name Croydon comes from Crogdene or Croindone, named by the Saxons in the 8th century when they settled here, although the area had been inhabited since prehistoric times. It is thought to derive from the Anglo-Saxon croeas deanas, meaning "the valley of the crocuses", indicating that, like Saffron Walden in Essex, it was a centre for the collection of saffron.

By the time of the Norman invasion Croydon had a church, a mill and around 365 inhabitants as recorded in the Domesday Book. The Archbishop of Canterbury, Archbishop Lanfranc lived at Croydon Palace which still stands. Visitors included Thomas Becket (another Archbishop), and royal figures such as Henry VIII of England and Elizabeth I. The royal charter for Surrey Street Market dates back to 1276, 

Croydon carried on through the ages as a prosperous market town, they produced charcoal, tanned leather, and ventured into brewing. Croydon was served by the Surrey Iron Railway, the first public railway (horse drawn) in the world, in 1803, and by the London to Brighton rail link in the mid-19th century, helping it to become the largest town in what was then Surrey.

In the 20th century Croydon became known for industries such as metal working, car manufacture and its aerodrome, Croydon Airport. Starting out during World War I as an airfield for protection against Zeppelins, an adjacent airfield was combined, and the new aerodrome opened on 29 March 1920. It became the largest in London, and was the main terminal for international air freight into the capital. It developed into one of the great airports of the world during the 1920s and 1930s, and welcomed the world's pioneer aviators in its heyday. British Airways Ltd used the airport for a short period after redirecting from Northolt Aerodrome, and Croydon was the operating base for Imperial Airways. It was partly due to the airport that Croydon suffered heavy bomb damage during World War II. As aviation technology progressed, however, and aircraft became larger and more numerous, it was recognised in 1952 that the airport would be too small to cope with the ever-increasing volume of air traffic. The last scheduled flight departed on 30 September 1959. It was superseded as the main airport by both London Heathrow and London Gatwick Airport (see below). The air terminal, now known as Airport House, has been restored, and has a hotel and museum in it.

In the late 1950s and through the 1960s the council commercialised the centre of Croydon with massive development of office blocks and the Whitgift Centre which was formerly the biggest in-town shopping centre in Europe. The centre was officially opened in October 1970 by the Duchess of Kent. The original Whitgift School there had moved to Haling Park, South Croydon in the 1930s; the replacement school on the site, Whitgift Middle School, now the Trinity School of John Whitgift, moved to Shirley Park in the 1960s, when the buildings were demolished.

The borough council unsuccessfully applied for city status in 1965, 2000 and again in 2002. If it had been successful, it would have been the third local authority in Greater London to hold that status, along with the City of London and the City of Westminster. At present the London Borough of Croydon is the second most populous local government district of England without city status, Kirklees being the first. Croydon's applications were refused as it was felt not to have an identity separate from the rest of Greater London. In 1965 it was described as "...now just part of the London conurbation and almost indistinguishable from many of the other Greater London boroughs" and in 2000 as having "no particular identity of its own".

Croydon, in common with many other areas, was hit by extensive rioting in August 2011. Reeves, an historic furniture store established in 1867, that gave its name to a junction and tram stop in the town centre, was destroyed by arson.

Croydon is currently going through a vigorous regeneration plan, called Croydon Vision 2020. This will change the urban planning of central Croydon completely. Its main aims are to make Croydon London's Third City and the hub of retail, business, culture and living in south London and South East England. The plan was showcased in a series of events called Croydon Expo. It was aimed at business and residents in the London Borough of Croydon, to demonstrate the £3.5bn development projects the Council wishes to see in Croydon in the next ten years.

There have also been exhibitions for regional districts of Croydon, including Waddon, South Norwood and Woodside, Purley, New Addington and Coulsdon. Examples of upcoming architecture featured in the expo can easily be found to the centre of the borough, in the form of the Croydon Gateway site and the Cherry Orchard Road Towers.

Governance

Croydon Council representation

Croydon London Borough Council has seventy councillors elected in 28 wards.

From the borough's creation in 1965 until 1994 the council saw continuous control under first Conservatives and Residents' Ratepayers councillors up to 1986 and then Conservatives. From 1994 to 2006 Labour Party councillors controlled the council. After a further eight-year period of Conservative control the Labour group secured a ten-seat majority in the local council elections on 22 May 2014. Councillor Tony Newman returned to lead the council for Labour. Labour remained in power until the 2022 election where no party had overall control. However, the party holding the executive Mayor, and as a result executive power, is the Conservative Party. Since the 2022 Croydon London Borough Council election the composition of the Council is as follows:

Elected mayor
A campaign group supporting an elected mayor for Croydon called DEMOC started a petition in February 2020, which they submitted to the council in September 2020. The mayoral system would replace the leader-and-cabinet system, whereby the leader of the council is chosen by the majority party or coalition of parties. The referendum was held in October 2021, resulting in a majority in favour of the mayoral system, with more than 80% of valid votes being cast in favour of the change.

The first elected mayor is the Conservative, Jason Perry. elected on 9 May 2022. The Deputy Mayor is Cllr. Lynne Hale. The Chief Executive since 14 September 2020 has been Katherine Kerswell.

Westminster representation

The borough is covered by three parliamentary constituencies: these are Croydon North, Croydon Central and Croydon South.

Civic history
For much of its history, Croydon Council was controlled by the Conservative Party or independents. Former Croydon councillors include former MPs Andrew Pelling, Vivian Bendall, David Congdon, Geraint Davies and Reg Prentice, London Assembly member Valerie Shawcross, Lord Bowness, John Donaldson, Baron Donaldson of Lymington (Master of the Rolls) and H.T. Muggeridge, MP and father of Malcolm Muggeridge. The first Mayor of the newly created county borough was Jabez Balfour, later a disgraced Member of Parliament. Former Conservative Director of Campaigning, Gavin Barwell, was a Croydon councillor between 1998 and 2010 and was the MP for Croydon Central from 2010 until 2017. Sarah Jones (politician) won the Croydon Central seat for Labour in 2017.  Croydon North has a Labour MP, Steve Reed (politician), and Croydon South has a Conservative MP, Chris Philp.
 
Some 10,000 people work directly or indirectly for the council, at its main offices at Bernard Weatherill House or in its schools, care homes, housing offices or work depots.

Government buildings

Croydon Town Hall on Katharine Street in Central Croydon houses the committee rooms, the mayor's and other councillors' offices, electoral services and the arts and heritage services.
The present Town Hall is Croydon's third. The first town hall is thought to have been built in either 1566 or 1609. The second was built in 1808 to serve the growing town but was demolished after the present town hall was erected in 1895.

The 1808 building cost £8,000, which was regarded as an enormous sum for those days and was perhaps as controversial as the administrative building Bernard Weatherill House opened for occupation in 2013 and reputed to have cost £220,000,000. The early 19th century building was known initially as "Courthouse" as, like its predecessor and successor, the local court met there. The building stood on the western side of the High Street near to the junction with Surrey Street, the location of the town's market. The building became inadequate for the growing local administrative responsibilities and stood at a narrow point of a High Street in need of widening.

The present town hall was designed by local architect Charles Henman and was officially opened by the Prince and Princess of Wales on 19 May 1896. It was constructed in red brick, sourced from Wrotham in Kent, with Portland stone dressings and green Westmoreland slates for the roof. It also housed the court and most central council employees.

The Borough's incorporation in 1883 and a desire to improve central Croydon with improvements to traffic flows and the removal of social deprivation in Middle Row prompted the move to a new configuration of town hall provision. The second closure of the Central Railway Station provided the corporation with the opportunity to buy the station land from the London, Brighton and South Coast Railway Company for £11,500 to provide the site for the new town hall. Indeed, the council hoped to be able to sell on some of the land purchased with enough for municipal needs and still "leave a considerable margin of land which might be disposed of". The purchase of the failed railway station came despite local leaders having successfully urged the re-opening of the poorly patronised railway station. The railway station re-opening had failed to be a success so freeing up the land for alternative use.

Parts, including the former court rooms, have been converted into the Museum of Croydon and exhibition galleries. The original public library was converted into the David Lean Cinema, part of the Croydon Clocktower. The Braithwaite Hall is used for events and performances. The town hall was renovated in the mid-1990s and the imposing central staircase, long closed to the public and kept for councillors only, was re-opened in 1994. The civic complex, meanwhile, was substantially added to, with buildings across Mint Walk and the 19-floor Taberner House to house the rapidly expanding corporation's employees.

Ruskin House is the headquarters of Croydon's Labour, Trade Union and Co-operative movements and is itself a co-operative with shareholders from organisations across the three movements. In the 19th century, Croydon was a bustling commercial centre of London. It was said that, at the turn of the 20th century, approximately £10,000 was spent in Croydon's taverns and inns every week. For the early labour movement, then, it was natural to meet in the town's public houses, in this environment. However, the temperance movement was equally strong, and Georgina King Lewis, a keen member of the Croydon United Temperance Council, took it upon herself to establish a dry centre for the labour movement. The first Ruskin House was highly successful, and there has been two more since. The current house was officially opened in 1967 by the then Labour Prime Minister, Harold Wilson. Today, Ruskin House continues to serve as the headquarters of the Trade Union, Labour and Co-operative movements in Croydon, hosting a range of meetings and being the base for several labour movement groups. Office tenants include the headquarters of the Communist Party of Britain and Croydon Labour Party. Geraint Davies, the MP for Croydon Central, had offices in the building, until he was defeated by Andrew Pelling and is now the Labour representative standing for Swansea West in Wales.

Taberner House was built between 1964 and 1967, designed by architect H. Thornley, with Allan Holt and Hugh Lea as borough engineers. Although the council had needed extra space since the 1920s, it was only with the imminent creation of the London Borough of Croydon that action was taken. The building, being demolished in 2014, was in classic 1960s style, praised at the time but subsequently much derided. It has its elegant upper slab block narrowing towards both ends, a formal device which has been compared to the famous Pirelli Tower in Milan. It was named after Ernest Taberner OBE, Town Clerk from 1937 to 1963. Until September 2013, Taberner House housed most of the council's central employees and was the main location for the public to access information and services, particularly with respect to housing.

In September 2013, Council staff moved into Bernard Weatherill House in Fell Road, (named after the former Speaker of the House and Member of Parliament for Croydon North-East). Staff from the Met Police, NHS, Jobcentre Plus, Croydon Credit Union, Citizens Advice Bureau as well as 75 services from the council all moved to the new building.

Geography and climate
The borough is in the far south of London, with the M25 orbital motorway stretching to the south of it, between Croydon and Tandridge. To the north and east, the borough mainly borders the London Borough of Bromley, and in the north west the boroughs of Lambeth and Southwark. The boroughs of Sutton and Merton are located directly to the west. It is at the head of the River Wandle, just to the north of a significant gap in the North Downs. The main town centre houses a great variety of well-known stores on North End and two shopping centres. It was pedestrianised in 1989 to attract people back to the town centre. Another shopping centre called Park Place was due to open in 2012 but has since been scrapped.

Townscape description

The CR postcode area covers most of the south and centre of the borough while the SE and SW postcodes cover the northern parts, including Crystal Palace, Upper Norwood, South Norwood, Selhurst (part), Thornton Heath (part), Norbury and Pollards Hill (part).

Districts in the London Borough of Croydon include Addington, a village to the east of Croydon which until 2000 was poorly linked to the rest of the borough as it was without any railway or light rail stations, with only a few patchy bus services. Addiscombe is a district just northeast of the centre of Croydon, and is popular with commuters to central London as it is close to the busy East Croydon station. Ashburton, to the northeast of Croydon, is mostly home to residential houses and flats, being named after Ashburton House, one of the three big houses in the Addiscombe area. Broad Green is a small district, centred on a large green with many homes and local shops in West Croydon. Coombe is an area, just east of Croydon, which has barely been urbanised and has retained its collection of large houses fairly intact. Coulsdon, south west of Central Croydon, which has retained a good mix of traditional high street shops as well as a large number of restaurants for its size. Croydon is the principal area of the borough, Crystal Palace is an area north of Croydon, which is shared with the London Boroughs of Lambeth, Southwark, Lewisham and Bromley. Fairfield, just northeast of Croydon, holds the Fairfield Halls and the village of Forestdale, to the east of Croydon's main area, commenced work in the late 1960s and completed in the mid-70s to create a larger town on what was previously open ground. Hamsey Green is a place on the plateau of the North Downs, south of Croydon. Kenley, again south of the centre, lie within the London Green Belt and features a landscape dominated by green space. New Addington, to the east, is a large local council estate surrounded by open countryside and golf courses. Norbury, to the northwest, is a suburb with a large ethnic population. Norwood New Town is a part of the Norwood triangle, to the north of Croydon. Monks Orchard is a small district made up of large houses and open space in the northeast of the borough. Pollards Hill is a residential district with houses on roads, which are lined with pollarded lime trees, stretching to Norbury. Purley, to the south, is a main town whose name derives from "pirlea", which means 'Peartree lea'. Sanderstead, to the south, is a village mainly on high ground at the edge of suburban development in Greater London. Selhurst is a town, to the north of Croydon, which holds the nationally known school, The BRIT School. Selsdon is a suburb which was developed during the inter-war period in the 1920s and 1930s, and is remarkable for its many Art Deco houses, to the southeast of Croydon Centre. Shirley, is to the east of Croydon, and holds Shirley Windmill. South Croydon, to the south of Croydon, is a locality which holds local landmarks such as The Swan and Sugarloaf public house and independent Whitgift School part of the Whitgift Foundation. South Norwood, to the north, is in common with West Norwood and Upper Norwood, named after a contraction of Great North Wood and has a population of around 14,590. Thornton Heath is a town, to the northwest of Croydon, which holds Croydon's principal hospital Mayday. Upper Norwood is north of Croydon, on a mainly elevated area of the borough. Waddon is a residential area, mainly based on the Purley Way retail area, to the west of the borough. Woodside is located to the northeast of the borough, with streets based on Woodside Green, a small sized area of green land. And finally Whyteleafe is a town, right to the edge of Croydon with some areas in the Surrey district of Tandridge.

Croydon is a gateway to the south from central London, with some major roads running through it. Purley Way, part of the A23, was built to by-pass Croydon town centre. It is one of the busiest roads in the borough, and is the site of several major retail developments including one of only 18 IKEA stores in the country, built on the site of the former power station. The A23 continues southward as Brighton Road, which is the main route running towards the south from Croydon to Purley. The centre of Croydon is very congested, and the urban planning has since become out of date and quite inadequate, due to the expansion of Croydon's main shopping area and office blocks. Wellesley Road is a north–south dual carriageway that cuts through the centre of the town, and makes it hard to walk between the town centre's two railway stations. Croydon Vision 2020 includes a plan for a more pedestrian-friendly replacement. It has also been named as one of the worst roads for cyclists in the area. Construction of the Croydon Underpass beneath the junction of George Street and Wellesley Road/Park Lane started in the early 1960s, mainly to alleviate traffic congestion on Park Lane, above the underpass. The Croydon Flyover is also near the underpass, and next to Taberner House. It mainly leads traffic on to Duppas Hill, towards Purley Way with links to Sutton and Kingston upon Thames. The major junction on the flyover is for Old Town, which is also a large three-lane road.

Topography and climate

Croydon covers an area of 86.52 km2. Croydon's physical features consist of many hills and rivers that are spread out across the borough and into the North Downs, Surrey and the rest of south London. Addington Hills is a major hilly area to the south of London and is recognised as a significant obstacle to the growth of London from its origins as a port on the north side of the river, to a large circular city. The Great North Wood is a former natural oak forest that covered the Sydenham Ridge and the southern reaches of the River Effra and its tributaries. 

The most notable tree, called Vicar's Oak, marked the boundary of four ancient parishes; Lambeth, Camberwell, Croydon and Bromley. John Aubrey referred to this "ancient remarkable tree" in the past tense as early as 1718, but according to JB Wilson, the Vicar's Oak survived until 1825.

Croydon has a temperate climate in common with most areas of Great Britain: its Köppen climate classification is Cfb. Its mean annual temperature of 9.6 °C is similar to that experienced throughout the Weald, and slightly cooler than nearby areas such as the Sussex coast and central London. Rainfall is considerably below England's average (1971–2000) level of 838 mm, and every month is drier overall than the England average.

The nearest weather station is at Gatwick Airport.

Architecture

The skyline of Croydon has significantly changed over the past 50 years. High rise buildings, mainly office blocks, now dominate the skyline. The most notable of these buildings include Croydon Council's headquarters Taberner House, which has been compared to the famous Pirelli Tower of Milan, and the Nestlé Tower, the former UK headquarters of Nestlé.

In recent years, the development of tall buildings, such as the approved Croydon Vocational Tower and Wellesley Square, has been encouraged in the London Plan, and will lead to the erection of new skyscrapers in the coming years as part of London's high-rise boom.

No. 1 Croydon, formerly the NLA Tower, Britain's 88th tallest tower, close to East Croydon station, is an example of 1970s architecture. The tower was originally nicknamed the Threepenny bit building, as it resembles a stack of pre-decimalisation Threepence coins, which were 12-sided. It is now most commonly called The Octagon, being 8-sided.

Lunar House is another high-rise building. Like other government office buildings on Wellesley Road, such as Apollo House, the name of the building was inspired by the US moon landings (In the Croydon suburb of New Addington there is a public house, built during the same period, called The Man on the Moon). Lunar House houses the Home Office building for Visas and Immigration. Apollo House houses The Border Patrol Agency.

A new generation of buildings are being considered by the council as part of Croydon Vision 2020, so that the borough doesn't lose its title of having the "largest office space in the south east", excluding central London. Projects such as Wellesley Square, which will be a mix of residential and retail with an eye-catching colour design and 100 George Street a proposed modern office block are incorporated in this vision.

Notable events that have happened to Croydon's skyline include the Millennium project to create the largest single urban lighting project ever. It was created for the buildings of Croydon to illuminate them for the third millennium. The project provided new lighting for the buildings, and provided an opportunity to project images and words onto them, mixing art and poetry with coloured light, and also displaying public information after dark. Apart from increasing night time activity in Croydon and thereby reducing the fear of crime, it helped to promote the sustainable use of older buildings by displaying them in a more positive way.

Landmarks
There are a large number of attractions and places of interest all across the borough of Croydon, ranging from historic sites in the north and south to modern towers in the centre.

Croydon Airport was once London's main airport, but closed on 30 September 1959 due to the expansion of London and because it didn't have room to grow; so Heathrow International Airport took over as London's main airport. It has now been mostly converted to offices, although some important elements of the airport remain. It is a tourist attraction.

The Croydon Clocktower arts venue was opened by Elizabeth II in 1994. It includes the Braithwaite Hall (the former reference library - named after the Rev. Braithwaite who donated it to the town) for live events, David Lean Cinema (built in memory of David Lean), the Museum of Croydon and Croydon Central Library. The Museum of Croydon (formerly known as Croydon Lifetimes Museum) highlights Croydon in the past and the present and currently features high-profile exhibitions including the Riesco Collection, The Art of Dr Seuss and the Whatever the Weather gallery. Shirley Windmill is a working windmill and one of the few surviving large windmills in Surrey, built in 1854. It is Grade II listed and received a £218,100 grant from the Heritage Lottery Fund. Addington Palace is an 18th-century mansion in Addington which was originally built as Addington Place in the 16th century. The palace became the official second residence of six archbishops, five of whom are buried in St Mary's Church and churchyard nearby.

North End is the main pedestrianised shopping road in Croydon, having Centrale to one side and the Whitgift Centre to the other. The Warehouse Theatre is a popular theatre for mostly young performers and is due to get a face-lift on the Croydon Gateway site.

The Nestlé Tower was the UK headquarters of Nestlé and is one of the tallest towers in England, which is due to be re-fitted during the Park Place development. The Fairfield Halls is a well known concert hall and exhibition centre, opened in 1962. It is frequently used for BBC recordings and was formerly the home of ITV's World of Sport. It includes the Ashcroft Theatre and the Arnhem Gallery.

Croydon Palace was the summer residence of the Archbishop of Canterbury for over 500 years and included regular visitors such as Henry III and Queen Elizabeth I. It is thought to have been built around 960. Croydon Cemetery is a large cemetery and crematorium west of Croydon and is most famous for the gravestone of Derek Bentley, who was wrongly hanged in 1953. Mitcham Common is an area of common land partly shared with the boroughs of Sutton and Merton. Almost 500,000 years ago, Mitcham Common formed part of the river bed of the River Thames.

The BRIT School is a performing Arts & Technology school, owned by the BRIT Trust (known for the BRIT Awards Music Ceremony). Famous former students include Kellie Shirley, Amy Winehouse, Leona Lewis, Adele, Kate Nash, Dane Bowers, Katie Melua and Lyndon David-Hall. Grants is an entertainment venue in the centre of Croydon which includes a Vue cinema.

Surrey Street Market has roots in the 13th century, or earlier, and was chartered by the Archbishop of Canterbury in 1276. The market is regularly used as a location for TV, film and advertising. Croydon Minster, formerly the parish church, was established in the Anglo-Saxon period, and parts of the surviving building (notably the tower) date from the 14th and 15th centuries. However, the church was largely destroyed by fire in 1867, so the present structure is a rebuild of 1867–69 to the designs of George Gilbert Scott. It is the burial place of six archbishops, and contains monuments to Archbishops Sheldon and Whitgift.

Demography

Population change
The table shows population change since 1801, including the percentage change since previous census. Although the London Borough of Croydon has existed only since 1965, earlier figures have been generated by combining data from the towns, villages, and civil parishes that would later be absorbed into the authority.

Ethnicity

According to the 2011 census, Croydon had a population of 363,378, making Croydon the most populated borough in Greater London. The estimated population in 2017 was around 384,800. 186,900 were males, with 197,900 females. The density was 4,448 inhabitants per km2. 248,200 residents of Croydon were between the age of 16 and 64.

In 2011, white was the majority ethnicity with 55.1%. Black was the second-largest ethnicity with 20.2%; 16.4% were Asian and 8.3% stated to be something other.

The most common householder type were owner occupied with only a small percentage rented. Many new housing schemes and developments are currently taking place in Croydon, such as The Exchange and Bridge House, IYLO, Wellesley Square (now known as Saffron Square) and Altitude 25. In 2006, The Metropolitan Police recorded a 10% fall in the number of crimes committed in Croydon, better than the rate which crime in London as a whole is falling. Croydon has had the highest fall in the number of cases of violence against the person in south London, and is one of the top 10 safest local authorities in London. According to Your Croydon (a local community magazine) this is due to a stronger partnership struck between Croydon Council and the police. In 2007, overall crime figures across the borough saw decrease of 5%, with the number of incidents decreasing from 32,506 in 2006 to 30,862 in 2007. However, in the year ending April 2012, The Metropolitan Police recorded the highest rates for murder and rape throughout London in Croydon, accounting for almost 10% of all murders, and 7% of all rapes. Croydon has five police stations. Croydon police station is on Park Lane in the centre of the town near the Fairfield Halls; South Norwood police station is a newly refurbished building just off the High Street; Norbury police station is on London Road; Kenley station is on Godstone Road; and New Addington police station is on Addington Village road.

Religion

The predominant religion of the borough is Christianity. According to the 2021 United Kingdom census, the borough has over 190,880 Christians, mainly Protestants. This is the largest religious following in the borough followed by Islam with 40,717 Muslims resident.

101,119 Croydon residents stated that they are atheist or non-religious in the 2021 Census.

Croydon Minster is the most notable of the borough's 35 churches. This church was founded in Saxon times, since there is a record of "a priest of Croydon" in 960, although the first record of a church building is in the Domesday Book (1086). In its final medieval form, the church was mainly a Perpendicular-style structure, but this was severely damaged by fire in 1867, following which only the tower, south porch and outer walls remained. Under the direction of Sir George Gilbert Scott the church was rebuilt, incorporating the remains and essentially following the design of the medieval building, and was reconsecrated in 1870. It still contains several important monuments and fittings saved from the old church.

The Area Bishop of Croydon is a position as a suffragan Bishop in the Anglican Diocese of Southwark. The present bishop is the Right Reverend Jonathan Clark.

Economy

The main employment sectors of the Borough is retail and enterprise which is mainly based in Central Croydon. Major employers are well-known companies, who hold stores or offices in the town. Purley Way is a major employer of people, looking for jobs as sales assistants, sales consultants and store managerial jobs. IKEA Croydon, when it was built in 1992, brought many non-skilled jobs to Croydon. The store, which is a total size of 23,000 m2, took over the former site of Croydon Power station, which had led to the unemployment of many skilled workers. In May 2006, the extension of the IKEA made it the fifth biggest employer in Croydon, and includes the extension of the showroom, market hall and self-serve areas.

Other big employers around Purley include the large Tesco Extra store in the town centre, along with other stores in Purley Way including Sainsbury's, B&Q and Vue. Croydon town centre is also a major retail centre, and home to many high street and department stores as well as designer boutiques. The main town centre shopping areas are on the North End precinct, in the Whitgift Centre, Centrale and St George's Walk. Department stores in Croydon town centre include House of Fraser, Marks and Spencer, Allders, Debenhams and T.K. Maxx. Croydon's main market is Surrey Street Market, which has a royal charter dating back to 1276. Shopping areas outside the town centre include the Valley Park retail complex, Croydon Colonnades, Croydon Fiveways, and the Waddon Goods Park.

In research from 2010 on retail footprint, Croydon came out as 29th in terms of retail expenditure at £770 million. This puts it 6th in the Greater London area, falling behind Kingston upon Thames and Westfield London. In 2005, Croydon came 21st, second in London behind the West End, with £909 million, whilst Kingston was 24th with £864 million. In a 2004 survey on the top retail destinations, Croydon was 27th.

In 2007, Croydon leapt up the annual business growth league table, with a 14% rise in new firms trading in the borough after 125 new companies started up, increasing the number from 900 to 1,025, enabling the town, which has also won the Enterprising Britain Award and "the most enterprising borough in London" award, to jump from 31 to 14 in the table.

Tramlink created many jobs when it opened in 2000, not only drivers but engineers as well. Many of the people involved came from Croydon, which was the original hub of the system. Retail stores inside both Centrale and the Whitgift Centre as well as on North End employee people regularly and create many jobs, especially at Christmas. As well as the new building of Park Place, which will create yet more jobs, so will the regeneration of Croydon, called Croydon Vision 2020, highlighted in the Croydon Expo which includes the Croydon Gateway, Wellesley Square, Central One plus much more.

Croydon is a major office area in the south east of England, being the largest outside of central London. Many powerful companies based in Europe and worldwide have European or British headquarters in the town. American International Group (AIG) have offices in No. 1 Croydon, formerly the NLA Tower, shared with Liberata, Pegasus and the Institute of Public Finance. AIG is the sixth-largest company in the world according to the 2007 Forbes Global 2000 list. The Swiss company Nestlé has its UK headquarters in the Nestlé Tower, on the site of the formerly proposed Park Place shopping centre. Real Digital International has developed a purpose built  factory on Purley Way equipped with "the most sophisticated production equipment and technical solutions". ntl:Telewest, now Virgin Media, have offices at Communications House, from the Telewest side when it was known as Croydon Cable.

The Home Office UK Visas and Immigration department has its headquarters in Lunar House in Central Croydon. In 1981, Superdrug opened a  distribution centre and office complex at Beddington Lane. The head office of international engineering and management consultant Mott MacDonald is located in Mott MacDonald House on Sydenham Road, one of four offices they occupy in the town centre. BT has large offices in Prospect East in Central Croydon. The Royal Bank of Scotland also has large offices in Purley, south of Croydon. Direct Line also has an office opposite Taberner House. Other companies with offices in Croydon include Lloyds TSB, Merrill Lynch and Balfour Beatty. Ann Summers used to have its headquarters in the borough but has moved to the Wapses Lodge Roundabout in Tandridge.

The Council declared bankruptcy via a section 114 notice in December 2020.

Transport

Rail

East Croydon and West Croydon are the main stations in the borough.
South Croydon railway station is also a railway station in Croydon, but it is lesser known.

East Croydon is served by Govia Thameslink Railway, operating under the Southern and Thameslink brands. Services travel via the Brighton Main Line north to London Victoria, London Bridge, London St Pancras, Luton Airport, Bedford, Cambridge, Peterborough and Milton Keynes Central, and south to Gatwick Airport, Ore, Brighton, Littlehampton, Bognor Regis, Southampton and Portsmouth. East Croydon is the largest and busiest station in Croydon and the third busiest in London, excluding Travelcard Zone 1.

East Croydon was served by long distance Arriva CrossCountry services to Birmingham and the North of England until they were withdrawn in December 2008.

West Croydon is served by London Overground and Southern services north to Highbury & Islington, London Bridge and London Victoria, and south to Sutton and Epsom Downs.

South Croydon is mainly served by Network Rail services operated by Southern for suburban lines to and from London Bridge, London Victoria and the eastern part of Surrey.

Croydon is one of only five London Boroughs not to have at least one London Underground station within its boundaries, with the closest tube station being Morden.

Bus

A sizeable bus infrastructure which is part of the London Buses network operates from a hub at West Croydon bus station. The original bus station opened in May 1985, closing in October 2014. A new bus station opened in October 2016.

Addington Village Interchange is a regional bus terminal in Addington Village which has an interchange between Tramlink and bus services in the remote area. Services are operated under contract by Abellio London, Arriva London, London Central, Metrobus, Quality Line and Selkent.

Tram

The  Tramlink light rail system opened in 2000, serving the borough and surrounding areas. Its network consists of three lines, from Elmers End to West Croydon, from Beckenham to West Croydon, and from New Addington to Wimbledon, with all three lines running via the Croydon loop on which it is centred. It is also the only tram system in London but there is another light rail system, the Docklands Light Railway. It serves Mitcham, Woodside, Addiscombe and the Purley Way retail and industrial area amongst others.

Road
Croydon is linked into the national motorway network via the M23 and M25 orbital motorway. The M25 skirts the south of the borough, linking Croydon with other parts of London and the surrounding counties; the M23 branches from the M25 close to Coulsdon, linking the town with the south coast, Crawley, Reigate, and Gatwick Airport. The A23 connects the borough with the motorways. The A23 is the major trunk road through Croydon, linking it with central London, East Sussex, Horsham, and Littlehaven. The old London to Brighton road, passes through the west of the borough on Purley Way, bypassing the commercial centre of Croydon which it once did.

The A22 and A23 are the major trunk roads through Croydon. These both run north–south, connecting to each other in Purley. The A22 connects Croydon, its starting point, to East Grinstead, Tunbridge Wells, Uckfield, and Eastbourne. Other major roads generally radiate spoke-like from the town centre. The A23 road, cuts right through Croydon, and it starts from London and links to Brighton and Gatwick Airport .Wellesley Road is an urban dual carriageway which cuts through the middle of the central business district. It was constructed in the 1960s as part of a planned ring road for Croydon and includes an underpass, which allows traffic to avoid going into the town centre.

Air
Gatwick Airport opened in August 1930 as an aerodrome and is a major international operational base for British Airways, EasyJet and Virgin Atlantic. It currently handles around 35 million passengers a year, making it London's second largest airport, and the second busiest airport in the United Kingdom after Heathrow. Heathrow, London City and Luton airports all lie within a two hours' drive of Croydon. Gatwick and Luton Airports are connected to Croydon by frequent direct trains, while Heathrow is accessible by the route X26 bus.

Cycling
Although hilly, Croydon is compact and has few major trunk roads running through it. It is on one of the Connect2 schemes which are part of the National Cycle Network route running around Croydon. The North Downs, an area of outstanding natural beauty popular with both on- and off-road cyclists, is so close to Croydon that part of the park lies within the borough boundary, and there are routes into the park almost from the civic centre.

Travel to work
In March 2011, the main forms of transport that residents used to travel to work were: driving a car or van, 20.2% of all residents aged 16–74; train, 59.5%; bus, minibus or coach, 7.5%; on foot, 5.1%; underground, metro, light rail, tram, 4.3%; work mainly at or from home, 2.9%; passenger in a car or van, 1.5%.

Public services

Home Office policing in Croydon is provided by the Metropolitan Police. The force's Croydon arm have their head offices for policing on Park Lane next to the Fairfield Halls and Croydon College in central Croydon. Public transport is co-ordinated by Transport for London. Statutory emergency fire and rescue service is provided by the London Fire Brigade, which has five stations in Croydon.

Health services
NHS South West London Clinical Commissioning Group (A merger of the previous NHS Croydon CCG and others in South West London) is the body responsible for public health and for planning and funding health services in the borough. Croydon has 227 GPs in 64 practices, 156 dentists in 51 practices, 166 pharmacists and 70 optometrists in 28 practices.

Croydon University Hospital, formerly known as Mayday Hospital, built on a  site in Thornton Heath at the west of Croydon's boundaries with Merton, is a large NHS hospital administrated by Croydon Health Services NHS Trust. Former names of the hospital include the Croydon Union Infirmary from 1885 to 1923 and the Mayday Road Hospital from 1923 to around 1930. It is a District General Hospital with a 24-hour accident and emergency department. NHS Direct has a regional centre based at the hospital. The NHS Trust also provides services at Purley War Memorial Hospital, in Purley. Croydon General Hospital was on London Road but services transferred to Mayday, as the size of this hospital was insufficient to cope with the growing population of the borough. Sickle Cell and Thalassaemia Centre and the Emergency Minor Treatment Centre are other smaller hospitals operated by the Mayday in the borough. Cane Hill was a psychiatric hospital in Coulsdon.

Waste management
Waste management is co-ordinated by the local authority. Unlike other waste disposal authorities in Greater London, Croydon's rubbish is collected independently and isn't part of a waste authority unit. Locally produced inert waste for disposal is sent to landfill in the south of Croydon. There have recently been calls by the ODPM to bring waste management powers to the Greater London Authority, giving it a waste function. The Mayor of London has made repeated attempts to bring the different waste authorities together, to form a single waste authority in London. This has faced significant opposition from existing authorities. However, it has had significant support from all other sectors and the surrounding regions managing most of London's waste. Croydon has the joint best recycling rate in London, at 36%, but the refuse collectors have been criticised for their rushed performance lacking quality. Croydon's distribution network operator for electricity is EDF Energy Networks; there are no power stations in the borough. Thames Water manages Croydon's drinking and waste water; water supplies being sourced from several local reservoirs, including Beckton and King George VI. Before 1971, Croydon Corporation was responsible for water treatment in the borough.

London Fire Brigade
The borough of Croydon is 86.52 kmsq, populating approximately 340,000 people. There are five fire stations within the borough; Addington (two pumping appliances), Croydon (two pumping appliances, incident response unit, fire rescue unit and a USAR appliance), Norbury (two pumping appliances), Purley (one pumping appliance) and Woodside (one pumping appliance). Purley has the largest station ground, but dealt with the fewest incidents during 2006/07.

The fire stations, as part of the Community Fire Safety scheme, visited 49 schools in 2006/2007.

Education

The borough compared with the other London boroughs has the highest number of schools in it, with 26% of its population under 20 years old. They include primary schools (95), secondary schools (21) and four further education establishments. Croydon College has its main building in Central Croydon, it is a high rise building. John Ruskin College is one of the other colleges in the borough, located in Addington and Coulsdon College in Coulsdon. South Norwood has been the home of Spurgeon's College, a world-famous Baptist theological college, since 1923; Spurgeon's is located on South Norwood Hill and currently has some 1000 students. The London Borough of Croydon is the local education authority for the borough.

Overall, Croydon was ranked 77th out of all the local education authorities in the UK, up from 92nd in 2007. In 2007, the Croydon LEA was ranked 81st out of 149 in the country – and 21st in Greater London – based on the percentage of pupils attaining at least 5 A*–C grades at GCSE including maths and English (37.8% compared with the national average of 46.7%). The most successful public sector schools in 2010 were Harris City Academy Crystal Palace and Coloma Convent Girls' School. The percentage of pupils achieving 5 A*-C GCSEs including maths and English was above the national average in 2010.

Libraries
The borough of Croydon has 14 libraries, a joint library and a mobile library. Many of the libraries were built a long time ago and therefore have become outdated, so the council started updating a few including Ashburton Library which moved from its former spot into the state-of-the-art Ashburton Learning Village complex which is on the former site of the old 'A Block' of Ashburton Community School which is now situated inside the centre. The library is now on one floor. This format was planned to be rolled out across all of the council's libraries but what was seen as costing too much.

South Norwood Library, New Addington Library, Shirley Library, Selsdon Library, Sanderstead Library, Broad Green, Purley Library, Coulsdon Library and Bradmore Green Library are examples of older council libraries. The main library is Croydon Central Library which holds many references, newspaper archives and a tourist information point (one of three in southeast London). Upper Norwood Library is a joint library with the London Borough of Lambeth. This means that both councils fund the library and its resources, but even though Lambeth have nearly doubled their funding for the library in the past several years Croydon has kept it the same, doubting the future of the library.

Sport and leisure

The borough has been criticised in the past for not having enough leisure facilities, maintaining the position of Croydon as a three star borough. Thornton Heath's ageing sports centre has been demolished and replaced by a newer more modern leisure centre. South Norwood Leisure Centre was closed down in 2006 so that it could be demolished and re-designed from scratch like Thornton Heath, at an estimated cost of around £10 million.

In May 2006 the Conservative Party took control of Croydon Council and decided a refurbishment would be more economical than rebuilding, this decision caused some controversy.

Sport Croydon, is the commercial arm for leisure in the borough. Fusion currently provides leisure services for the council, a contract previously held by Parkwood Leisure.

Football teams include Crystal Palace F.C., which play at Selhurst Park, and in the Premier League. AFC Croydon Athletic, whose nickname is The Rams, is a football club who play at Croydon Sports Arena along with Croydon F.C., both in the Combined Counties League and Holmesdale, who were founded in South Norwood but currently playing on Oakley Road in Bromley, currently in the Southern Counties East Football League.

Non-football teams that play in Croydon are Streatham-Croydon RFC, a rugby union club in Thornton Heath who play at Frant Road, as well as South London Storm Rugby League Club, based at Streatham's ground, who compete in the Rugby League Conference. Another rugby union club that play in Croydon is Croydon RFC, who play at Addington Road. The London Olympians are an American Football team that play in Division 1 South in the British American Football League. The Croydon Pirates are one of the most successful teams in the British Baseball Federation, though their ground is actually just located outside the borough in Sutton.

Croydon Amphibians SC plays in the Division 2 British Water Polo League. The team won the National League Division 2 in 2008.

Croydon has over 120 parks and open spaces, ranging from the  Selsdon Wood Nature Reserve to many recreation grounds and sports fields scattered throughout the Borough.

Culture

Croydon has cut funding to the Warehouse Theatre.

In 2005, Croydon Council drew up a Public Art Strategy, with a vision intended to be accessible and to enhance people's enjoyment of their surroundings. The public art strategy delivered a new event called Croydon's Summer Festival hosted in Lloyd Park. The festival consists of two days of events. The first is called Croydon's World Party which is a free one-day event with three stages featuring world, jazz and dance music from the UK and internationally. The final days event is the Croydon Mela, a day of music with a mix of traditional Asian culture and east-meets-western club beats across four stages as well as dozens of food stalls and a funfair. It has attracted crowds of over 50,000 people. The strategy also created a creative industries hub in Old Town, ensured that public art is included in developments such as College Green and Ruskin Square and investigated the possibility of gallery space in the Cultural Quarter.

Fairfield Halls, Arnhem Gallery and the Ashcroft Theatre show productions that are held throughout the year such as drama, ballet, opera and pantomimes and can be converted to show films. It also contains the Arnhem Gallery civic hall and an art gallery. Other cultural activities, including shopping and exhibitions, are Surrey Street Market which is mainly a meat and vegetables market near the main shopping environment of Croydon. The market has a Royal Charter dating back to 1276. Airport House is a newly refurbished conference and exhibition centre inside part of Croydon Airport. The Whitgift Centre is the current main shopping centre in the borough. Centrale is a new shopping centre that houses many more familiar names, as well as Croydon's House of Fraser.

Media
There are three local newspapers which operate within the borough. The Croydon Advertiser began life in 1869, and was in 2005 the third-best selling paid-for weekly newspaper in London. The Advertiser is Croydon's major paid-for weekly paper and is on sale every Friday in five geographical editions: Croydon; Sutton & Epsom; Coulsdon & Purley; New Addington; and Caterham. The paper converted from a broadsheet to a compact (tabloid) format on 31 March 2006. It was bought by Northcliffe Media which is part of the Daily Mail and General Trust group on 6 July 2007. The Croydon Post is a free newspaper available across the borough and is operated by the Advertiser group. The circulation of the newspaper was in 2008 more than the main title published by the Advertiser Group.

The Croydon Guardian is another local weekly paper, which is paid for at newsagents but free at Croydon Council libraries and via deliveries. It is one of the best circulated local newspapers in London and once had the highest circulation in Croydon with around one thousand more copies distributed than The Post.

The borough is served by the London regional versions of BBC and ITV coverage, from either the Crystal Palace or Croydon transmitters.

Croydon Television is owned by Croydon broadcasting corporation. Broadcasting from studios in Croydon, the CBC is fully independent. It does not receive any government or local council grants or funding and is supported by donations, sponsorship and by commercial advertising.

Capital Radio and Gold serve the borough. Local BBC radio is provided by BBC London 94.9. Other stations include Kiss 100, Absolute Radio and Magic 105.4 FM from Bauer Radio and Capital Xtra, Heart 106.2 and Smooth Radio from Global Radio. In 2012, Croydon Radio, an online and FM radio station, and the first official FM radio station for the London Borough of Croydon, began serving the area. The borough is also home to its own local TV station, Croydon TV.

Twinning

The London Borough of Croydon is twinned with the municipality of Arnhem which is located in the east of the Netherlands. The city of Arnhem is one of the 20 largest cities in the Netherlands. They have been twinned since 1946 after both towns had suffered extensive bomb damage during the recently ended war. There is also a Guyanese link supported by the council.

Investment in the tobacco industry
In September 2009 it was revealed that Croydon Council had around £20m of its pension fund for employees invested in shares in Imperial Tobacco and British American Tobacco. Members of the opposition Labour group on the council, who had banned such shareholdings when in control, described this as "dealing in death" and inconsistent with the council's tobacco control strategy.

See also

 List of people from Croydon
 UK postcodes – a note of why and how postcodes CR0 and CR9 differ from the others

References

External links

 London Borough of Croydon
 Croydon Television
 Visit Croydon
 map of croydon districts superimposed on google

 
Croydon
1965 establishments in the United Kingdom
Coast to Capital Local Enterprise Partnership